The India House is a historical building in George Town, Penang, Malaysia.

History
In the early 20th century, the land of the building was used by the Huttenbach Brothers & Co. for their business. The present building was constructed in 1937 until 1941. During the Japanese occupation of Malaya in World War II, the building was left unoccupied. Following the destruction of the earlier George Town Hongkong and Shanghai Banking Corporation headquarters in World War II, the India House served as the location of the bank until the bank returned to the reconstructed HSBC building in 1951. The India House was later used by the United States Information Service until the 1970s.

Architecture
The building is a two-story building with Indian art deco style designed by S.N.A.S Sockalingam Chettiar.

See also
 List of tourist attractions in Penang

References

1941 establishments in British Malaya
Buildings and structures in George Town, Penang